"It's My Life" is a song by German production group Sash!. The record was released in 1996 via X-IT Records as the debut single from their debut studio album It's My Life – The Album. Sascha Lappessen performed the vocal part for this song, but there was no video recorded for the single.

Track listing

References

1996 debut singles
1996 songs
Sash! songs